Marvin is a village in Union County, North Carolina, United States. The population was 5,579 at the 2010 census. It is a more rural suburb of Charlotte.

Geography
Marvin is a border territory, which lies in the state of North Carolina but borders South Carolina to the southwest.

Demographics

As of the census of 2010, there were 5,579 people, 1,553 households, and 1,463 families residing in the village. The population density was 1429 people per square mile (551.8/km2). There were 1506 housing units at an average density of 386 per square mile (149.1/km2). The racial makeup of the village was 86.2% White, 5.7% African American, 5.4% Asian, and 1.6% from two or more races. Hispanic or Latino of any race were 3.3% of the population.

There were 1553 households, out of which 67.7% had children under the age of 18 living with them, 89.4% were married couples living together, 2.3% had a female householder with no husband present, and 5.8% were non-families. 4.8% of all households were made up of individuals, and 1.7% had someone living alone who was 65 years of age or older. The average household size was 3.59 and the average family size was 3.73.

In the village, the population was spread out, with 33.6% under the age of 18, 3.4% from 18 to 24, 33.8% from 25 to 44, 24.2% from 45 to 64, and 5.1% who were 65 years of age or older. The median age was 37 years. For every 100 females, there were 102.5 males. For every 100 females age 18 and over, there were 97.1 males.

The median income for a household in the village was $157,297, and the median income for a family was $158,537. Males had a median income of $127,159 versus $51,053 for females. The per capita income for the village was $57,822. About 1.6% of families and 1.6% of the population were below the poverty line, including 2.2% of those under age 18 and 0% of those age 65 or over.

The Village enacted a new land use plan in 2004, to establish its desire to preserve its open spaces firmly, and low-density character. Marvin is located near Ballantyne, South Charlotte.

In April 2022, the village opened a village hall near Marvin Elementary School.

References

Villages in Union County, North Carolina
Villages in North Carolina